Golan was an elite series of men's and women's professional one-day road bicycle races held in Syria. The event consisted of two one-day races (Golan I and Golan II). Each of the events were rated by the UCI as a 1.2 races.

Golan I Past winners

Men

Women
Source:

Golan II Past winners

Men

Women
Source:

References 

Women's road bicycle races
Cycle racing in Syria
UCI Asia Tour races